Tosa may refer to:

Places
 Tosa, Kōchi a city in Kōchi Prefecture, Japan
 Tosa, Kōchi (town), a town in Kōchi Prefecture, Japan
 Tosa District, Kōchi
 Tosa province and Tosa Domain, now known as Kōchi Prefecture
 Wauwatosa, known to locals as Tosa, a city in Wisconsin

People with the surname
, Japanese shogi player
 Tosa Mitsunobu
 Tosa Mitsuoki
 Reiko Tosa, marathon runner
, Japanese diver

Other uses
 Tosa dialect
 Tosa-mi, or tataki, a cooking technique
 Tosa (dog)
 Tosa-class battleship
 Japanese battleship Tosa, the lead ship of the Tosa class
 TOSA (bus), a concept electric bus
 The Sharp Zaurus model SL-6000

See also

 Cima Tosa, a peak in the Brenta Dolomites
 Tosa d'Alp, or La Tosa, in the Pyrenees
 Tosa corner or hairpin of the San Marino Grand Prix race track
Tosia, name
Toska (disambiguation)

Japanese-language surnames